is a Japanese writer, tarento, and pornographic director. From June 2009 she is represented with Horipro. She serves as a regular commentator in the Tokyo MX series 5-Ji ni Muchū!

Filmography

Bibliography
 As Shimako Takeuchi (novels)

 As Shimako Takeuchi (essays)

 As Shimako Takeuchi (novels)

 As Shimako Iwai (essays, dialogues)

Videography

Magazine serials

References

External links
Shimako Iwai - Onna no Ulagawa: Meiki Dai Sakusen 
 
Watanabe Productions profile 

Japanese women novelists
Japanese horror writers
Horipro artists
People from Okayama Prefecture
1964 births
Living people
Japanese pornographic film directors